Dalian Polytechnic University is a public university in Dalian, Liaoning, China.

History
The school was founded in 1958 in Shenyang as the Shenyang Institute of Light Industry. In 1970, the institute moved to Dalian and renamed to the Dalian Institute of Light Industry. In 2006, previously holding the college status, the institute received its university status and renamed to Dalian Polytechnic University.

It is the only institution of higher education in northeastern China specializing in light industry, food, textiles, and art design. There are about 15,000 students on the  campus. Subjects taught include engineering, science, arts, management, and economics.

External links
University official homepage

Universities and colleges in Dalian
Educational institutions established in 1958
1958 establishments in China